Cristóbal Balenciaga Eizaguirre (21 January 1895 – 23 March 1972) was a Spanish fashion designer, and the founder of the Balenciaga clothing brand. He had a reputation as a couturier of uncompromising standards and was referred to as "the master of us all" by Christian Dior and as "the only couturier in the truest sense of the word" by Coco Chanel, who continued, "The others are simply fashion designers". On the day of his death, in 1972, Women's Wear Daily ran the headline "The King is Dead".

Since 2011 the purpose-built Museo Balenciaga has exhibited examples of his work in his birth town Getaria. Many of the 1,200 pieces in the collection were supplied by his pupil Hubert de Givenchy and clients such as Grace Kelly.

Life and career 

Balenciaga was born in Getaria, province of Gipuzkoa, Spanish Basque Country on 21 January 1895. His father was a fisherman who died when Cristobal was a boy, and his mother a seamstress. As a child Balenciaga often spent time with his mother as she worked.  At the age of twelve, he began work as the apprentice of a tailor. When he was a teenager, the Marchioness de Casa Torres, the foremost noblewoman in his town, became his customer and patron. She sent him to Madrid, where he was formally trained in tailoring. Balenciaga is notable as one of the few couturiers in fashion history who could not only use his own hands to create, but pattern, cut, and sew the designs which symbolized the height of his artistry.

Balenciaga was successful during his early career as a designer in Spain.  He opened a boutique in San Sebastián in 1919, which expanded to include branches in Madrid and Barcelona. The Spanish royal family and the aristocracy wore his designs, but when the Spanish Civil War forced him to close his stores, Balenciaga moved to Paris. He opened his Paris couture house on Avenue George V in August 1937.

However, it was not until the post-war years that the full scale of the inventiveness of his highly original designs became evident. In 1951, he totally transformed the silhouette, broadening the shoulders and removing the waist. In 1955, he designed the tunic dress, which later developed into the chemise dress of 1957. In 1959, his work culminated in the Empire line, with high-waisted dresses and coats cut like kimono.

In 1960 he made the wedding dress for Fabiola de Mora y Aragón when she married King Baudouin I of Belgium. The Queen later donated her wedding dress to the Cristóbal Balenciaga Foundation. He created many designs for socialite Aline Griffith, diplomat Margarita Salaverría Galárraga, and designer Meye Allende de Maier, considering them his muses. He taught fashion design classes, inspiring other designers including Oscar de la Renta, André Courrèges, Emanuel Ungaro, Mila Schön and Hubert de Givenchy. His often spare, sculptural creations were considered masterworks of haute couture in the 1950s and 1960s.

Balenciaga closed his house in 1968 at the age of 74 after working in Paris for 30 years. He decided to retire and closed his fashion houses in Paris, Barcelona and Madrid, one after the other. Balenciaga died on 23 March 1972 in Xàbia, Spain.

Today the Balenciaga fashion house continues under the direction of Demna Gvasalia and under the ownership of the Kering group.

Work 

During the 1950s, designers like Christian Dior, Pierre Balmain, and Coco Chanel emerged, creating pieces very representative to their fashion houses and to their own styles. An important protagonist for this period was Cristobal Balenciaga. This Spanish fashion designer was known as "The King of Fashion" and was one of the great masterminds of the period. Balenciaga was born and raised in Spain, where he worked for the Spanish royalty, but because of the Spanish Civil War he moved to Paris where he became the King of Fashion.

The most eye-catching designer of this period was Balenciaga because of his structural designs, which had never before been seen in the fashion world. He was a master of tailoring, and he was able to translate his illustrations from paper to real life. His advanced tailoring skills gave him an advantage over designers all over the world, making him a major target for customers. "He reshaped women's silhouette in the 1950s, so that clothes we think as typical of that decade are mostly dilutions of his work." (Irvine, 2013) Compared to some work like the New Look from Christian Dior, which featured full skirts and a tiny waist, Balenciaga changed these to look like the one-seam Yoki coat, or to voluminous looks. These looks caused customers to travel from all over the world for his outfits.

Personal life 

Balenciaga was gay, although he kept his sexuality private throughout his life. The love of his life and his long time partner was Franco-Polish millionaire Władzio Jaworowski d’Attainville, who had helped set him up and fund him. When d'Attainville died in 1948, Balenciaga was so broken he considered closing the business. His next collection after d'Attainville's death was designed entirely in black to mourn his loss.

Expositions 

On 24 March 2011, San Francisco's M. H. de Young Museum celebrated the opening of "Balenciaga and Spain", a 120-piece fashion retrospective of his career. "You can't even measure it", said Rodarte designer Laura Mulleavy, of Balenciaga's influence. The $2,500-a-ticket fund-raiser for the museum drew 350 guests, including Marissa Mayer, Jamie Tisch, Gwyneth Paltrow, Orlando Bloom, Balthazar Getty, Maggie Rizer, Connie Nielsen, Maria Bello and Mia Wasikowska.

On 7 June 2011, the Balenciaga Museum was inaugurated in his hometown of Getaria by Queen Sofía and with the presence of Hubert de Givenchy, who is honorific president of the Balenciaga Foundation. The museum has a collection of more than 1,200 pieces designed by Balenciaga, some of them donations by disciples, like Givenchy, or clients, like Queen Fabiola of Belgium and the heirs of Grace Kelly.

His most famous clients were Mona von Bismarck, Gloria Guinness, Grace Kelly, Ava Gardner, Audrey Hepburn and Jackie Kennedy.

Retirement and death 
Balenciaga retired from the high fashion world in 1968. First, he decided to retire from active life in May 1968 and, a few months later, on July 1, the newspapers broke the news of his headquarters in Paris and his studios in Madrid closing. The closing down of his business was by surprise, like a bombshell; not even his employees knew.

Balenciaga justified the closing with his habitual clinical brevity: “High fashion is mortally wounded”. On one hand, the intense imposing burden of the French taxes blew through the largest part of the profits and, on the other, the Americans stopped buying French high fashion, largely because of General De Gaulle’s Anti-American politics. The Americans had succeeded in signifying close to 70 percent of the Balenciaga clientele.

Balenciaga returned to Spain. He ended his days living in his Altea house, where he enjoyed painting, talking, and eating in the company of some of his Spanish assistants.

As an exception, four years after his retirement, he accepted the job of designing a gown, Carmen Martínez-Bordiú’s wedding dress, the daughter of one of his most important clients, Carmen Franco Polo, and hence, the granddaughter of dictator Francisco Franco. The wedding was celebrated on March 8th, 1972, Martínez-Bordiu’s dress being Balenciaga’s last work.

That same month of March 1972, Balenciaga was going to go on a few vacations to Jávea’s National Parador of Tourism, in Alicante. He was not sick, nor known of any serious ailment, but unexpectedly on March 23rd, he suffered a heart attack, followed by heart failure. Balenciaga was 77 years old at the time of his death. He was buried in Getaria, his birthplace.

Legacy 
The closing of Balenciaga’s high fashion house in 1968 did not signify the extinction of “Balenciaga’s brand”. The brand was inactive until 1986 when Jacques Konckier of Jacques Bogart bought the Balenciaga company.

Although separate from the big name of its creator, Balenciaga has actively kept up in the fashion world since then as far as relevance. The reason behind his relevance still today is “his sense of proportion and measurement, and his vision and interpretation of the female body have anointed him as one of the more influential designers of all time". Balenciaga comprises products of high fashion, ready-to-wear, perfumery, jewels, and other accessories. The Balenciaga business has mainly kept active in the perfumery and accessories spectrum. In the news, the Balenciaga bags are some of the more desired by fashion victims. Other objects of desire from the Balenciaga business are their shoes, for their great originality in design. In the historic collections of the Museum of Textile and Clothing in Barcelona, Balenciaga’s hats and headdresses stand out, for their great variety of shapes.

In the studio of Cristóbal Balenciaga, many couturiers formed, some of which would reach international fame and would get to have their own business. Among these include Paco Rabanne, André Courreges, Emanuel Ungaro, Hubert de Givenchy, or Óscar de la Renta.

His work has been an object of numerous museum study expositions, starting with an anthology exposition that the New York Metropolitan Museum provided in 1973 (The World of Balenciaga), which exhibited for six months, with 180 models on display. Balenciaga’s garments accompanied the paintings of Goya, Velázquez, El Greco, Zuloaga, Miró or Picasso, in which they had inspired the designs of the Basque couturier. It was the first time that an art museum of the ranking of the New York Metropolitan Museum added dresses to the category of works of art. In Spain, a namesake exposition was also celebrated, The World of Balenciaga, which was installed in the noble living rooms of the Palace of Library and National Museums in Madrid.

In his birthplace, a foundation was established with the objective of creating a museum dedicated to his big name. After numerous problems and the avoided judicial process about alleged inconsistencies in its management, The Balenciaga Museum finally opened in Getaria on June 10, 2011. The museum has 1200 pieces, although only one part displays simultaneously. The works are displayed on invisible mannequins.

His friend, the sculptor Eduardo Chillida, made a sculpture-tribute called Homage to Balenciaga.    

The city, San Sebastián, also pays homage with a promenade, that is situated in the neighborhood of Igueldo, where Balenciaga had a house.

Presence in Museums 
The Balenciaga Museum, open to the public in Getaria, has a collection of 1200 pieces. The Museum of Textile and Clothing of Disseny Hub Barcelona has an extensive collection of Balenciaga dresses and accessories (especially hats). The Madrid Garment Museum also has a fashion collection that includes Balenciaga dresses. Within these exhibitions and pieces, people can find, like seen in the Victoria and Albert Museum in London, "sculptural silhouettes that the forms of architecture drink from, in the geometric lines of their patterns and also in the set with the volumes that allowed to go without saying as far as unthinkable in 1958, with his babydoll model: inspired in children clothing, the dress left in flotation without pressure to the figure and with total freedom of movement to the user".

References

Bibliography 

 Alzugaray, Juan José. “Cristóbal Balenciaga Eizaguirre.” Vascos Relevantes Del Siglo XX, Ediciones Encuentro, 2004, p. 63.
 ARZALLUZ, Miren, Cristóbal Balenciaga, la forja del maestro (1895-1936), San Sebastián, Diputación Foral de Guipúzcoa y Nerea, 2010.
 Azurmendi, Nerea. “El Museo Se Viste De Diario.” El Diario Vasco, 2011, www.diariovasco.com/20110611/mas-actualidad/cultura/balenciaga-abre-puertas-getaria-201106111016.html?ref=https%3A%2F%2Fwww.diariovasco.com%2F20110611%2Fmas-actualidad%2Fcultura%2Fbalenciaga-abre-puertas-getaria-201106111016.html.
 BOWLES, H., "Balenciaga and Spain", Nueva York, Rizzoli, 2010.
 Bowles, Hamish. “Shaping Fashion: Vogue’s Hamish Bowles Explores a Buzzed-About Balenciaga Exhibition at the Victoria and Albert Museum.” Vogue, 2017, www.vogue.com/article/hamish-bowles-balenciaga-exhibition-victoria-and-albert-museum.
 Charleston, Beth Duncuff, "Cristobal Balenciaga (1895-1972)". Timeline of Art History. Metropolitan Museum of Art, 2004.
 “Cristóbal Balenciaga.” Cristóbal Balenciaga Museoa, www.cristobalbalenciagamuseoa.com/descubre/cristobal-balenciaga/.
 Cristóbal Balenciaga Museoa, www.cristobalbalenciagamuseoa.com/.
 De La Torriente, Eugenia. “Balenciaga Vuelve Al Mar.” El País, 2011, elpais.com/diario/2011/06/02/cultura/1306965605_850215.html.
 De La Torriente, Eugenia. “La Geometría Estética De Balenciaga Vuelve a Casa.” El País, 11 May 2010, elpais.com/diario/2010/05/11/cultura/1273528802_850215.html.
 El País (11 de mayo de 2010): «La geometría estética de Balenciaga vuelve a casa», consultado 26 de mayo de 2020.
 España, 50 años de moda, Barcelona, Ajuntament de Barcelona, 1987-1988, p. 25.
 Izaguirre, Boris. “El Hijo De Un Pescador Que Se Convirtió En El Diseñador Español Más Famoso De La Historia.” Vanity Fair España, 9 Dec. 2016, www.revistavanityfair.es/la-revista/articulos/cristobal-balenciaga/23197.
 JOUVE, M. A., y DEMORNEX, J., "Balenciaga", París, Éditions du Regard, 1988.
 JOUVE, M. A., "Balenciaga", París, Assouline, 1998.
 Luengo, Pilar. “Jacques Konckier.” El País, 15 Nov. 1987, elpais.com/diario/1987/11/16/ultima/564015606_850215.html.
 Martínez Tato, Marta. “El Legado De Balenciaga, Como Nunca Lo Habías Visto.” Vanity Fair España, 2018, www.revistavanityfair.es/lujo/moda/articulos/exposicion-balenciaga-patrimonio-y-moda/29994.
 Menkes, Suzy. “Museum to Open in Basque Designer's Birthplace : Temple to a Monk of Fashion.” The New York Times, 2000, www.nytimes.com/2000/05/23/style/IHT-museum-to-open-in-basque-designers-birthplace-temple-to-a-monk-of.html.
 MILLER, L. E., "Cristóbal Balenciaga", Londres, Batsford, 1993.
 MILLER, L. E., "Cristóbal Balenciaga (1895-1972). Modisto de modistos", Barcelona, Gustavo Gili, 2007.
 Museo Del Traje, www.culturaydeporte.gob.es/mtraje/inicio.html.
 Tubella, Patricia. “Cristóbal Balenciaga Resucita En Una Gran Exposición En Londres.” El País, 2017, elpais.com/elpais/2017/06/02/estilo/1496418240_815685.html.
 Victoria and Albert Museum, Online Museum. “Cristóbal Balenciaga.” Victoria and Albert Museum, Victoria and Albert Museum, Cromwell Road, South Kensington, London SW7 2RL,  26 Oct. 2005, web.archive.org/web/20070529102155/www.vam.ac.uk/collections/fashion/1960s/fashion_designers/balenciaga/index.html.
 VV.AA. "Balenciaga", catálogo del Museo Cristóbal Balenciaga de Guetaria, San Sebastián, Nerea, 2011.

External links 

 Official website - Balenciaga house
 Balenciaga Museum
 Cristóbal Balenciaga at Chicago History Museum Digital Collections
 Balenciaga
 
 
 Balenciaga library collection at the BelMal Malletier Fashion Library (Belgium)
 Charleston, Beth Duncuff. “Cristobal Balenciaga (1895–1972).” In Heilbrunn Timeline of Art History. New York: The Metropolitan Museum of Art, 2000–. (October 2004)
 

1895 births
1972 deaths
Basque artists
LGBT fashion designers
Spanish gay artists
Spanish fashion designers
People from Urola Kosta
Gucci people
20th-century Spanish LGBT people